Harris Hill Raceway (H2R) is a paved road racing track in San Marcos, Texas used for both auto and motorcycle racing.

History 
Harris Hill Raceway was conceived as a local place to drive high-performance cars, responding to the lack of club-based tracks in Central Texas. The track was founded by Bo Rivers with his daughter Dacia and her spouse Eric Beverding. The track was paved in December 2007 and officially opened in June 2008. The track broadened its offerings to driver education, corporate events, and team programs in response to the recession, and gained sponsorship from Austin-area Mazda dealers. The track had 200 members .

In summer 2020 the track re-paved the rough surface and brought the back section between turns 6 and 7 inward to allow construction of FM 110.

The track includes a sports car club and a motorcycle club that each hold regular hours for members. Harris Hill also hosts H2R Challenge (Miata, 914, and Mustang classes), Longhorn Racing Academy (HPDE) and other driver training courses, SCCA's Track Night in America, ChampCar Endurance Series, and press events.

Track description 
Situated in the hills of northeastern San Marcos, Harris Hill was designed to feel like a drive through the Texas Hill Country. It features positive and negative camber turns, a sweeper, increasing and decreasing radius turns, and two blind corners. Turn 4, named for the patron saint of impossible tasks Santa Rita, has an  change in elevation up and down. The circuit is run clockwise (typical) or counter-clockwise directions.

Built upon  of clay soil of the Texas Blackland Prairies, Harris Hill develops bumps that add to its character.

The property contains a clubhouse with amenities, a garage with a mechanic, a banked dirt oval track, and a rally course just inside the paved track.

References

External links 

Motorsport venues in Texas
Buildings and structures in San Marcos, Texas